Paul Laurence Michael Rooney (born 22 March 1997) is an Irish professional footballer who plays as a defender for Havant & Waterlooville.

He spent his early senior career in his native Ireland at St Patrick's Athletic and Bohemians before signing for the English club Millwall. He had a loan spell at Torquay United during the 2016–17 season and made a permanent switch to Colchester United in January 2018. He joined Bromley on a short-term loan deal in September 2018 and then Billericay Town on another loan in November 2018. He was released by Colchester at the end of his contract in the summer of 2019.

Career
Born in Dublin, Ireland, Rooney came through the youth setup at St Patrick's Athletic. He was a part of the team that won the national under-19 league in 2015 by beating Derry City 3–2 in the final in Buncrana.

His debut in senior football was on 22 September 2015, a 1–0 loss against Dundalk in the semi-final of the Leinster Senior Cup at Richmond Park. Rooney went on to be an unused substitute in another 9 games for Pats in the 2015 season. He signed for Dublin rivals Bohemians ahead of the 2016 League of Ireland season. He made 2 appearances for the club, a 4–3 win over Dundalk, and a 1–0 win over UCD, both in the Leinster Senior Cup.

Rooney signed for English club Millwall in July 2016. He made his Millwall debut on 8 November 2016 in a 3–1 win away to Luton Town in the Football League Trophy.

On 8 December 2016, Rooney signed a 28-day loan deal with National League club Torquay United. His loan was extended by a further 28 days on 6 January 2017.

On 24 January 2018, Rooney signed for League Two side Colchester United on a one-and-a-half year deal. He was called up to the first-team squad for the first time ahead of Colchester's League Two game against Yeovil Town on 17 March. He was given squad number 46.

On 4 September 2018, Rooney made his Colchester United debut starting in their 2–0 defeat by Southampton Under-21s in the EFL Trophy.

On 28 September 2018, Rooney joined National League side Bromley on loan in an initial month-long deal. He made his debut on 29 September in Bromley's 2–2 draw with FC Halifax Town.

After his Bromley loan ended in November, Rooney joined National League South side Billericay Town on loan on 30 November. He made his debut on 1 December in a 3–2 defeat to Oxford City. His loan was extended until the end of the season on 4 January 2019.

On 14 May 2019, it was announced Rooney was to leave Colchester United at the end of his contract.

In June 2019, he signed for Dover Athletic. Following's Dover's decision to not play any more matches in the 2020–21 season, made in late January, and subsequent null and voiding of all results, on 5 May 2021 it was announced that Rooney was out of contract and had left the club.

On 22 May 2021, Rooney joined National League South side Havant & Waterlooville.

Career statistics

References

1997 births
Living people
Republic of Ireland association footballers
St Patrick's Athletic F.C. players
Bohemian F.C. players
Millwall F.C. players
Torquay United F.C. players
Colchester United F.C. players
Bromley F.C. players
Billericay Town F.C. players
Dover Athletic F.C. players
Havant & Waterlooville F.C. players
League of Ireland players
National League (English football) players
Association football defenders
Republic of Ireland expatriate association footballers
Irish expatriate sportspeople in England
Expatriate footballers in England